Acquackanonk refers to the region and people along the Passaic River in northern New Jersey:

Acquackanonk tribe
Acquackanonk Township, New Jersey